Namaquanthus is a genus of flowering plants belonging to the family Aizoaceae. It contains a single species, Namaquanthus vanheerdei.

Its native range is South Africa.

References

Aizoaceae
Aizoaceae genera
Monotypic Caryophyllales genera
Taxa named by Louisa Bolus